Genchū (元中) was a Japanese era of the Southern Court during the Era of Northern and Southern Courts lasting from April 1384 to October 1392.  Reigning Emperors were Go-Kameyama in the south and Go-Komatsu in the north.

Nanboku-chō overview
   
During the Meiji period, an Imperial decree dated March 3, 1911, established that the legitimate reigning monarchs of this period were the direct descendants of Emperor Go-Daigo through Emperor Go-Murakami, whose  had been established in exile in Yoshino, near Nara.

Until the end of the Edo period, the militarily superior pretender-Emperors supported by the Ashikaga shogunate had been mistakenly incorporated in Imperial chronologies despite the undisputed fact that the Imperial Regalia were not in their possession.

This illegitimate  had been established in Kyoto by Ashikaga Takauji.

Events of the Genchū Era

Northern Court Equivalents
Shitoku
Kakei
Kōō
Meitoku – Genchū became Meitoku 3 when the Courts were united

Notes

References
 Nussbaum, Louis Frédéric and Käthe Roth. (2005). Japan Encyclopedia. Cambridge: Harvard University Press. ; OCLC 48943301
 Titsingh, Isaac. (1834). Nihon Ōdai Ichiran; ou,  Annales des empereurs du Japon.  Paris: Royal Asiatic Society, Oriental Translation Fund of Great Britain and Ireland. OCLC 5850691

External links
 National Diet Library, "The Japanese Calendar" – historical overview plus illustrative images from library's collection

Japanese eras
1390s in Japan
1380s in Japan